Lieutenant General Mohammed Saad Eddin Mamoun, usually known in English as Saad Mamoun (14 May 1922 – 28 October 2000), was an Egyptian war hero and was the commander of the Egyptian Second Army during the Yom Kippur War. He was commissioned in an infantry regiment in 1943 after graduating from the Egyptian Military Academy. He was wounded in action during the 1956 war as the commander of an infantry anti-Tank battalion. Along with Mohamed Abdel Ghani el-Gamasy, Hosni Mubarak, Helmy Afify Abd El-Bar and Kamal Hassan Ali, he was one of the heavyweight and close members of President Sadat's inner circle.

During the 1977 Egyptian bread riots, as commander of the Central Military Region, he is known to have refused to use deadly force against protestors in Cairo and to convince President Sadat to accede to some of the popular demands such as continuation of food and energy subsidies. After he retired from the Egyptian Army, he served as Governor of Cairo until 1983.

References

External links
 http://www.defencejournal.com/2002/nov/4th-round.htm 

Egyptian generals
Egyptian people of the Yom Kippur War
20th-century Egyptian military personnel
1922 births
2000 deaths